The 2011 Ghana Movie Awards was the second edition of the ceremony to reward film practitioners in the Ghana Film Industry. The event was held at Accra International Conference center on 25 December 2011. Winners included Kimberly Elise, Majid Michel, Somewhere in Africa. Ties That Bind had 21 nominations and eventually won 9 awards to top the winners list.  Olu Jacobs received the Lifetime Achievement Award.

Awards

Categories
 Best Actor In A Leading Role (English)
Van Vicker   – Paparazzi
Majid Michel – Somewhere in Africa
Chris Attoh  – 6 Hours To Christmas
Samuel Ofori – Fake London Boy
Rahim Banda  - Behind The Mask
 
 Best Actor In A Leading Role (Local)
Apostle John Prah – The Holy Bible
Bill Asamoah – Barfour
Kwaku Manu – Village Champion
Ebenezer Donkor – God Father
Agya Koo     – Agenkwah
Isaac Amoako – Emmanuel
 
 Best Actress In A Leading Role (English)
Jackie Appiah – Reason To Kill
Joselyn Canfor Dumas – Adams Apple 2
Kimberly Elise - Ties That Bind
Yvonne Okoro – Why Marry
Omotola Jalade Ekeinde – Ties That Bind
Lydia Forson – Masquerades
 
 Best Actress In A Leading Role (Local)
Vivian Jill – Yaw Donkor
Emelia Brobbey – Obi Yaa
Nana Ama McBrown – Wunni Pannie Due
Linda Abbey – Agya Koo Salamatu
Portia Asare Boateng – Ama Bonsu

 Best Actor In A Supporting Role (English)
Eddie Nartey – Somewhere in Africa
John Dumelo – Ties That Bind
Adjetey Anang – Adams Apple 3
Majid Michel – Somewhere in Africa
Gavivina Tamakloe – For Better For War
 
 Best Actor In A Supporting Role (Local)
Clement Bonney – Ama Bonsu
Joseph Osei – Osofo Amoako
Osei Tutu Nyamese – Wunni Pannie Due
Akwasi Boadi – Emmanuel
David Asuman – Diawuo
Fredrick Eghan – Agya Koo Gbengbentus
 
 Best Actress In A Supporting Role (English)
Roselyn  Ngissah  – Somewhere in Africa
Helen Asante – Adams Apple 3
Yvonne Nelson – 4 Play Reloaded
Martha Ankomah – Bed Of Roses
Nadia Buari – Who Owns The City
 
 Best Actress In A Supporting Role (Local)
Mercy Asiedu – Obi Yaa
Rose Mensah – Bu Bra Pa
Maame Serwaa – So, So And So
Ellen Kyei Whyte – Evil Soul
Jane Ackun – Otufoo
 
 Best Picture
Bed Of Roses
Ties That Bind
Single Six
Somewhere in Africa
Adams Apple
Who Owns The City
Kofi Agenkwa
Emmanuel
Masquerades
Agyaa Koo Gbengbentus
 
 Best Directing [English Language]
Frank Rajah Arase – Somewhere in Africa
Shirley Frimpong-Manso – Adams Apple
Leila Djansi & Kevin Huie – Ties That Bind
Pascal Amanfo – Bed Of Roses
Samuel Ofori – Fake London Boy
 
 Best Directing (Local)
Frank Gharbin – Emmanuel
Nana Ama Mcbrown – Obi Yaa
Augustine Abbey – Agya Koo Gbengbentus
Jonas Agyemang – Village Champion
Samuel Nkansah – God Father
 
 Best Art Direction
Kofi Agenkwa
Ties That Bind
Somewhere in Africa
Adams Apple 2
Who Owns The City
Black Man, White Brother
 
 Best Music - (Original Song)
"Agya Koo Gbengbentus" – Mframa
"Fake London Boy" – Tiffany
"Sexy Sassy Wahala" (Adams Apple) – Efya
"Ties That Bind" – Dela & Okyeame Quophi
"Paparazzi" – Kobby Maxwell
"Somewhere In Africa" – Bennie Anti
 
 Best Movie Africa Collaboration
6 Hours To Christmas
Masquerades
Ties That Bind
Single Six
Who Owns The City
 
 Best Cameo Actor
 Kwaku Sintim Misa – Adams Apple 1
 Kofi Okyere Darko – Adams Apple 1
 Abeeku Santana – Death After Birth
 Majid Michel – Adams Apple 4
 Okyeame Kwame – Ties That Bind
 Kofi Adjorlolo – Somewhere in Africa
 
 Best Cameo Actress
Juliet Ibrahim – 4 Play Reloaded
Grace Nortey – Adams Apple
Khareema Aguiar     – Ties That Bind
Lily Ameyaw – Otuofoo
 
 Best Story
Ties That Bind
Kofi Agenkwah
Adams Apple
Somewhere in Africa
Death After Birth
C.E.O.
 
 Best Editing
4 Play Reloaded
Adams Apple
Ties That Bind
Somewhere in Africa
God Father
 
 Best Cinematography
4 Play Reloaded
Adams Apple
Ties That Bind
Bed Of Roses
Somewhere in Africa
 
 Best Costume & Wardrobe
Osofo Amoako
Kofi Agenkwah
Ties That Bind
Adams Apple
Queens Pride
 
 Best Make-Up
Adams Apple
Somewhere in Africa
Ties That Bind
Grave Yard
Who Owns The City
 
 Best Visual Effects
God Father
Dirty Game
Grave Yard
Kofi Agenkwah
Paparazzi
 
 Best Discovery
Kwaku Manu – So, So And So
Mzbel – Single Six
Jasmine Baroudi – Adams Apple
Ama K. Abebrese – Ties That Bind
James Gardiner – C.E.O.
 
 Best Music - (Original Score)
Ties That Bind
Somewhere in Africa
Adams Apple
Emmanuel
Agya Koo Gbengbentus
 
 Best Sound Editing & Mixing
Ties That Bind
Adams Apple
4 Play Reloaded
Paparazzi
 
 Best Writing Adapted Or Original Screenplay
Somewhere in Africa
Ties That Bind
Adams Apple
Ama Bonus
Who Owns The City
 
 Best Actor Africa Collaboration
Ramsey Nouah – Memories Of My Heart
Desmond Elliot – Masquerades
Omar Oumson – Who Owns The City
Mike Ezuruonye – Private Enemy
Eddie Watson – Single Six
 
 Best Actress Africa Collaboration
Mercy Johnson – My Husband’s Funeral
Omotola Jalade Ekeinde – Ties That Bind
Ebbe Bassey – Ties That Bind
Tonto Dikeh – Private Enemy
Damilola Adegbite – 6 Hours To Christmas

Special Awards
 Favorite TV Actor
Funnyface Benson - Chokor Trotro
 Favorite TV Series
Chorkor Trotro
 Favorite Actress-Movie
 Martha Ankomah
 Favorite Actor-Movie
 Prince David Osei
 Lifetime Achievement Award
 Olu Jacobs

References

Ghana Movie Awards
Ghana
2011 in Ghana